The A183 road runs from South Shields in Tyne and Wear, through Sunderland and ends at Chester-le-Street in County Durham. It is a major route in South Tyneside, Sunderland and Chester-le-Street serving many areas and landmarks along its route.

Route

South Tyneside

The road begins in the centre of South Shields, at a junction with the A194 and  A1018, near the Town Hall, as Beach Road. Here it becomes Ocean Road, famous locally for its Indian restaurants. The A183 then becomes Sea Road as it passes between North Marine Park and South Marine Park, before meeting the B1344  at a roundabout with the Sea Hotel, which has recently gone into administration after the Coronavirus pandemic. The road then continues along the seafront area of the town as, passing Littlehaven Beach, the fairground, the Amphitheatre, Bents Park and local pubs. The road then turns at Colman’s Seafood Temple, famous locally for its Fish & Chips, and passes Gypsies Green Stadium. At the New Crown Hotel it becomes the Coast Road once past the junction for the Waters Edge public house, the road continues to Marsden without any turn junctions, passing The Leas on the coastal side, the finishing point for the Great North Run. The A183 then meets the A1300 at its junction on Redwell Lane and continues as the Coast Road. Next the road passes the famous Marsden Rock and Marsden Grotto on Marsden Beach. The A183 then continues at the Coast Road until it reaches Souter Lighthouse. There have been plans made by South Tyneside Council to realign a section of the road between the A1300 Redwell Lane and the Souter Lighthouse. The road now becomes Mill Lane as it passes through Whitburn Colliery, the road changes its name to East Street as it passes through Whitburn Village itself, where the road meets the B1299, taking traffic towards the village of Cleadon. After passing Cornthwaite Park, the A183 becomes Whitburn Bents Road and enters the borough of Sunderland.

Sunderland

 Once through Whitburn, the road enters Sunderland. The road continues as Whitburn Bents Road, before changing its name to Whitburn Road, as we reach a roundabout with Lowry Road - the entrance to a Morrisons - here we enter Seaburn, home of the annual Sunderland International Airshow which attracts 1.2 million visitors. Through Seaburn, the road passes lots of restaurants and bars, and also the B1291, before passing another roundabout, which mean we enter Roker. As Chester Road it runs past the city campus of the University, and through a commercial section before reaching the Sunderland Royal Hospital. It runs alongside Bishopwearmouth Cemetery towards the Grindon estate, where it crosses the B1405. It is here that it becomes a dual carriageway - running past the Pennywell and Hastings Hill estates, past the Sunderland Echo office, to reach the A19. Past the A19 the road runs past the Herrington Country Park and the Penshaw Monument, through Penshaw, before reaching a large roundabout at Shiney Row with the A182. Originally, the road carried on through Shiney Row - but due to traffic-calming measures and the opening of a new link road past the new Biddick Woods Estate (which lies to the west of Shiney Row), the B1519 uses the old A183. Instead, A183 becomes Washington Highway, and shares the A182 for approx , before coming onto its own again at Biddick Woods, changing its name to Basswood Road. It then links onto its original route just short of the county boundary, once again becoming Chester Road.

County Durham
The road becomes single carriageway once more, and passes out of Sunderland through Bournmoor, before passing the northern end of the A1052. It runs downhill alongside the river Wear, close to Lumley Castle - this stretch is called New Bridge Bank, and the road crosses over the New Bridge, one of the earliest crossings over the River Wear. The road ends at the A1(M) junction 67, with the A693 and A167.

References

Roads in England
Transport in Tyne and Wear
A183
Transport in County Durham
Roads in South Shields